Wank'ap'iti (Quechua wank'a rock, p'iti dividing by pulling powerfully to the extremes; gap, interruption, Hispanicized spelling Huancapeti, Huancapetí, Huancapete) is a  mountain in the Cordillera Negra in the Andes of Peru. It is situated in the Ancash Region, Aija Province, Aija District, and in the Recuay Province, Ticapampa District. Wank'ap'iti lies southeast of Puka Allpa.

References

Mountains of Peru
Mountains of Ancash Region